Dinesha Devnarain (born 12 November 1988) is a South African former cricketer who played as a right-handed batter and right-arm medium. She appeared in 29 One Day Internationals and 22 Twenty20 Internationals for South Africa between 2008 and 2016, including playing at the 2009 ICC Women's World Twenty20 and captaining the side in 2016. She played domestic cricket for KwaZulu-Natal Coastal.

She was Head Coach of Coronations for the first two seasons of the Women's T20 Super League. On 6 April 2020, she was appointed as South Africa women's U-19 head coach and as well as Women's National Academy head coach.

References

External links
 
 

1988 births
Living people
Cricketers from Johannesburg
South African women cricketers
South Africa women One Day International cricketers
South Africa women Twenty20 International cricketers
South Africa women's national cricket team captains
South African people of Indian descent
KwaZulu-Natal Coastal women cricketers
East Coast women cricketers
South African cricket coaches